David Thomas Ivor  Jenkins (3 June 1929 – 16 September 2014) was Archdeacon of Westmorland and Furness from 1999 until 1999.

Jenkins was educated at King's College London and ordained in 1953. After a curacy at Rugby he held incumbencies in Coventry and Carlisle. He was a Canon Residentiary at Carlisle Cathedral from 1991 to 1995.

Notes
 

 

1929 births
2014 deaths
Alumni of King's College London
Archdeacons of Westmorland and Furness